Sikander "Xander" Rizvi is a Pakistani restaurateur and film actor who is the founder of Xander's. 

Born in Karachi to the Jehan-Rizvi family; where his grandparents Noor Jehan and Shaukat Hussain Rizvi and other relatives Sonya Jehan, Zille Huma and Ahmed Ali Butt are all film personalities, he made his acting debut with a leading role in the romantic comedy Dekh Magar Pyar Se along with Humaima Malickwhich earned him praise.  He also owns a cafe in Karachi.

Career 
Rizvi started his acting career in 2015 with his debut film Dekh Magar Pyar Se playing the lead role opposite Humaima Malick, the romantic comedy was directed by Asad ul Haq and scripted by Saba Imtiaz. The film was released on the Independence Day, 14 August 2015.

Rizvi also played a supporting role in the 2017 war action film Yalghaar opposite Shaan Shahid, Humayun Saeed, and Adnan Siddiqui, directed and written by Hassan Waqas Rana. The film is based on the true story of the Second Battle of Swat, also known as Swat Operation. The film was  released in June 2017.

Personal life 
Sikander Rizvi was born in Karachi, Sindh, Pakistan to a Pakistani father, Akbar Hussain Rizvi, and French mother, Florence Villiers Rizvi. His paternal grandmother, actresssinger Noor Jehan, and grandfather, film producer Shaukat Hussain Rizvi, were the most influential film personalities of the subcontinent. His sister, Sonya Jehan, and cousin Ahmed Ali Butt, are both actors, while his aunt, Zille Huma, was a singer. He is also known as Xander among family and close friends, and owns a cafe named Xander's in Karachi.

Filmography

References

External links 
 

Living people
Pakistani male film actors
Pakistani restaurateurs
Pakistani chefs
Muhajir people
Pakistani people of French descent
21st-century Pakistani male actors
Year of birth missing (living people)